Steels Creek is a town in Victoria, Australia, 45 km north-east of Melbourne's central business district and 7 km north of Yarra Glen, located within the Shire of Yarra Ranges local government area.

The Post Office, Steel's Creek, opened on 14 March 1890 and closed in 1968.

Steels Creek has a community centre at the site of the public Primary School, which was closed down in 1992 by the Kennett Government.

2009 bushfire
At least 26 houses were destroyed in a major bushfire on 7 February 2009.

See also
 Bushfires in Australia

References

Towns in Victoria (Australia)
Yarra Valley
Yarra Ranges